Ochridaspongia rotunda is freshwater sponge endemic to Lake Ohrid. This sponge is found mostly at depths of 30–50 m and water temperatures of 6–8 °C. Its circular shape indicates the animal lives under conditions of relatively calm water.

Possible medicinal uses 
Following comparative tests with positive controls of its extracts against 8 bacterial and 8 fungal strains, Ohridaspongia rotunda has been described as a potential "gold mine of new antimicrobial substances with significant and broad-range activity". Current research is investigating its acetone extracts for application in the treatment of Alzheimer's disease, for which it has demonstrated promising inhibitory activity. These may originate with symbiotic bacteria hosted by the sponge and further research is required.

References

External links
 Нову врсту сунђера уловили су наши охридски рибари у Охридском језеру "Politika", Belgrade 1938-03-09

Haplosclerida
Freshwater animals of Europe
Endemic fauna of North Macedonia
Animals described in 1937